Federico Campbell Quiroz (July 1, 1941 – February 15, 2014) was a Mexican writer. Campbell is known for the short story collection Tijuanenses (Tijuana: Stories on the Border). In 2000, he won the Colima Prize for Fiction with his novel Transpeninsular. In 1995, he was awarded the J. S. Guggenheim Fellowship. Campbell translated works by Harold Pinter, David Mamet,  and Leonardo Sciascia, among others, into Spanish.

Born in Tijuana, Mexico, Campbell was the son of Carmen Quiroz, a teacher, and Federico Campbell, a telegraph operator whose ancestors migrated to Mexico from Virginia in the 1830s. He had two sisters, Sarina and Silvia Campbell Quiroz, and with Margarita Peña Muñoz, a Mexican translator and researcher interested in Novohispanic literature, had one son, Federico Campbell Peña, who is a journalist.

Works
 Pretexta (1979)
 Todo lo de las focas (1982; All about Seals)
 Tijuanenses (1989; Tijuana: Stories on the Border, 1995)
 La memoria de Sciascia (1989; Sciascia's Memory)
 La invención del poder (1994; The Invention of Power)
 Post scriptum triste (1994)
 Máscara negra (1995; Black Mask)
 Transpeninsular (2000)
 La clave Morse (2001; The Morse Code)
 El imperio del adiós (2002; The Empire of Farewell).

References

External links
 Campbell's blog

1941 births
2014 deaths
Mexican people of Scottish descent
Mexican people of American descent
People from Tijuana
Mexican translators
Writers from Baja California
20th-century translators
20th-century Mexican male writers
Mexican people of Irish descent